Shakhobidin Zoirov (born 3 March 1993) is an Uzbekistani professional boxer. As an amateur he won gold medals at the 2016 Summer Olympics and 2019 World Championships, both in the flyweight division.

Amateur career

Olympic result
Rio 2016
Round of 32: Defeated Brendan Irvine (Republic of Ireland) 3–0
Round of 16: Defeated Antonio Vargas (USA) 3–0
Quarter-finals: Defeated Elvin Mamishzada (Azerbaijan) 3–0
Semi-finals: Defeated Yoel Finol (Venezuela) 3–0
Final: Defeated Mikhail Aloyan (Russia) 3–0

World Championship result
2019 Yekaterinburg
Round 1: Defeated Yhlas Gylychjanov (Turkmenistan) 5–0
Round 2: Defeated Rodrigo Marte (Dominican Republic) 5–0
Round 3: Defeated Azat Usenaliev (Kyrgyzstan) 5–0
Quarter-finals: Defeated Daniel Asenov (Bulgaria) 5–0
Semi-finals: Defeated Billal Bennama (France) 5–0
Final: Defeated Amit Panghal (India) 5–0

Asian Games result
2014 Incheon
Preliminaries 2: Defeated Chang Yong (China) 3–0
Quarter-finals: Defeated Gaurav Bidhuri (India) 3–0
Semi-finals: Defeated Muhammad Waseem (Pakistan) 3–0
Final: Defeated by Ilyas Suleimenov (Kazakhstan) 2–1

Professional career
Zoirov made his professional debut on 5 April 2019 against Anthony Holt, scoring a knockout (KO) victory within the first minute of the opening round.

His second fight came on 18 May 2019 against Mishiko Shubitidze. Zoirov knocked his opponent down twice en route to a first-round technical knockout (TKO) victory. He next fought Sandeep Singh Bhatti on 12 July 2019. Zoirov was taken the distance for the first time in his professional career, winning via unanimous decision (UD) over four rounds.

Professional boxing record

References

External links
 

1993 births
Living people
Uzbekistani male boxers
Olympic boxers of Uzbekistan
Boxers at the 2016 Summer Olympics
Medalists at the 2016 Summer Olympics
Olympic gold medalists for Uzbekistan
Olympic medalists in boxing
Asian Games silver medalists for Uzbekistan
Medalists at the 2014 Asian Games
Asian Games medalists in boxing
Boxers at the 2014 Asian Games
AIBA World Boxing Championships medalists
Flyweight boxers
Super-bantamweight boxers
Southpaw boxers
People from Bukhara Region
Boxers at the 2020 Summer Olympics
21st-century Uzbekistani people